Koryfi (Greek: Κορυφή meaning pointy) is a community located in the Tsotyli municipal unit, situated in Kozani regional unit, in the Greek region of Macedonia.

References

Populated places in Kozani (regional unit)